Packe is a surname. Notable people with the surname include:

Charles Packe (1826–1896), British lawyer
Charles Packe (cricketer) ( 1909–1944), English cricketer
Charles Packe (MP) (1792–1867),  British politician
Christopher Packe (chemist) (b. in or before 1657, d. in or after 1708), English chemist
Christopher Packe (politician) (c. 1599–1682), Lord Mayor of London and member of the Drapers Company
Christopher Packe (painter) (1760–1840), British portrait and landscape painter
Christopher Packe (physician and cartographer) (1686–1749), English physician and geologist
Edward Packe (1878–1946), British civil servant
George Hussey Packe (1796–1874), British politician an army officer present at the Battle of Waterloo
Horace Packe (1865–1934), Archdeacon of Southland from 1913 until 1922
Michael Packe (1916–1978), British historian, biographer and cricketer
Robert Packe (1913–1935), English cricketer

See also 
 Pack (disambiguation)
 Packer (disambiguation)